The Johnson-McConnell agreement of 1966 was an agreement between United States Army Chief of Staff General Harold K. Johnson and United States Air Force Chief of Staff General John P. McConnell on 6 April 1966. The U.S. Army agreed to give up its fixed-wing tactical airlift aircraft, while the U.S. Air Force relinquished its claim to most forms of rotary wing aircraft. The most immediate effect was the transfer of Army DHC-4 Caribou aircraft to the Air Force.

Background

The value of tactical air transport had been demonstrated in World War II, proving especially valuable in mountainous and jungle regions of the China-Burma-India and Southwest Pacific theaters. In the 1950s, U.S. Air Force recognized this, and emphasised centralized management and control of airlift resources. At the same time, Army theorists considered the possibility of employing aircraft in the traditional roles of cavalry. In the Army's concept, aircraft were responsible to and under the command of the ground commanders. From the Air Force perspective, 

By 1960, the U.S. Army had 5,500 aircraft, and planned to acquire over 250 CV-2 Caribou aircraft (de Havilland Canada DHC-4 Caribou). The Army's 1962 Howze Board strongly endorsed the airmobility concept, calling for the creation of air assault divisions equipped with organic aircraft, supported by air transport brigades equipped with heavy helicopters and Caribou transports. To the Air Force, this sounded suspiciously like the Army creating a tactical air force of its own.

The U.S. Air Force opposed the introduction of Caribou aircraft to Vietnam, arguing that the C-123 Provider could carry twice the payload over three times the distance. However, the difference between the two aircraft narrowed under operational conditions, since fuel had to be traded off against payload, and the C-123 required  of runway for take-off, as opposed to the Caribou's . Once in Vietnam, the Caribou's ability to operate into short, unimproved strips soon proved its worth. Starting in July 1962, Caribous began flying two or three sorties per day into Lao Bao, a remote camp that was inaccessible to C-123s. By the end of 1965, there were 88 Caribou aircraft in Vietnam, and the Army was considering a proposal to procure 120 CV-7 Buffalo aircraft – something the Air Force viewed as a costly duplication of the C-123.

In 1966, the U.S. Air Force began to deploy CH-3 helicopters to Vietnam, on the "informal understanding" that "the Air Force would not attempt to deliver supplies to the Army by helicopter" but "critical shortages of Chinooks temporarily ended doctrinal rigidity". Air Force helicopters found themselves employed on a variety of tasks requiring heavy helicopters beyond their intended role in special air warfare.

Agreement
In late 1965, private negotiations began between Generals McConnell and Johnson over the transfer of Caribou and Buffalo aircraft to the Air Force. These were encouraged by the Chairman of the Joint Chiefs of Staff, General Earle Wheeler, who wished to avoid involving the Secretary of Defense, Robert McNamara, or the Joint Chiefs of Staff (where the other two services might exert their influence).

The text of the agreement, formally signed by McConnell and Johnson on 6 April 1966, read:

Outcome
The agreement was not warmly received by either service. Many Army officers felt that the Army had traded a real and valuable capability (the Caribous) for "empty guarantees of the status quo in helicopters". For its part, the Air Force was now responsible for manning and funding an aircraft that it had long opposed in return for renouncing rotary winged aircraft. Should technological progress ever favor such aircraft, then the Air Force would be in serious trouble.

In the short term, the agreement ushered in an era of "lukewarm cooperation" between the two services, and relief for the Army's critical pilot shortage; but the implications stretched far into the future. Once the war in Vietnam ended, the Air Force soon transferred all the C-7s and C-123s to the Air National Guard and Air Force Reserve. The Advanced Medium STOL Transport project was eventually cancelled, the Air Force arguing that surface-to-air missiles made tactical airlift too dangerous.

See also
 Key West Agreement of 1948
 Pace-Finletter MOU 1952

Notes

References

1966 documents
1966 in military history
Agreements
United States documents
United States Army aviation
20th-century military history of the United States
April 1966 events in the United States
1966 in the United States